Rimella is a genus of fossil sea snails, marine gastropod mollusks in the family Rostellariidae within the Stromboidea, the true conchs and their allies.

Species in this genus are extinct and were found from the Paleocene to the Oligocene of Europe.

Species
Species within the genus Rimella include:
 † Rimella cazesi Pacaud & Pons, 2015 
 † Rimella duplicicosta Cossmann, 1901 
 † Rimella fissurella  (Linnaeus, 1758) 
 † Rimella gomezi Pacaud & Pons, 2015 
 † Rimella gracilis Ma & Zhang, 1996
 † Rimella labrosa (G. B. Sowerby I, 1823) 
 † Rimella mexcala Kiel & Perrilliat, 2001 
 † Rimella obesa Cuvillier, 1935 
 † Rimella rimosa (Solander, 1766) 
 † Rimella sandrinae Pacaud & Pons, 2015 
Species brought into synonymy
 Rimella tyleri H. Adams & A. Adams, 1864: synonym of Varicospira tyleri'' (H. Adams & A. Adams, 1864)

References

External links
Rimella fissurella in the Paleobiology Database

Rostellariidae
Paleocene gastropods
Eocene gastropods
Oligocene gastropods
Prehistoric animals of Europe